The xiezhi is a mythical ancient creature of Chinese origin impact to throughout East Asian legends. It resembles an ox or goat, with thick dark fur covering its body, bright eyes, and a single long horn on its forehead. It has great intellect and understands human speech. The xiezhi possesses the innate ability to distinguish right from wrong and when it finds corrupt officials, it will ram them with its horn and devour them. It is known as a symbol of justice.

History 
According to legend, the xiezhi, was a single-horned sheep or goat which had power to divine the guilt or innocence of a person. Gao Yao, the minister of justice for the legendary Emperor Shun employed the beast during criminal proceedings, and he would command the sheep to ram (head-butt) the accused. The beast would ram the guilty, but spare the innocent. The account appears in Wang Chong, Lunheng (80 AD).

In the same work (Lunheng), the legend is prefaced the remark that public offices are painted with the images of the beast and the minister.

As a symbol of traditional Chinese law, xiezhi has been promoted by the Chinese Dynasties. The judicial hat was also referred to as the xiezhi after the mythical sheep/ox. The xiezhi hat was part of the attire of censors into the 8th century during the Tang period, especially for an impeachment trial.

Legend has it that during the Spring and Autumn Period and the Warring States Period, King Wen of Chu once obtained a xiezhi and put its image on his head, and then the xiezhi crown became a fashion in the State of Chu. Law enforcement officials in the Qin Dynasty also wore such crowns, as did the Han Dynasty, which inherited the Qin system. By the Eastern Han Dynasty, images of the xiezhi became an indispensable ornament in the Xie Men, and the XieZhi crown was titled on the law. Therefore, law enforcement officials were called xiezhi.

Mentions of the xiezhi in Chinese literature can be traced back to the Han Dynasty. "Rhapsody on the Imperial Park", Sima Xiangru mentions the xiezhi  "sagacious stag" among the preys in the year-end barricade hunt staged by the Son of Heaven. Scholar Yáng Fú (杨孚) described the xiezhi  in his treatise Yiwu Zhi as a "righteous beast, which rams the wrongful party when it sees a fight and bites the wrongful party when it hears an argument". It is described in the Shuowen Jiezi as being "a cattle-like beast with one horn; in ancient times. It settled disputes by ramming the party at fault".

As an inherently just beast, the xiezhi was used as a symbol of justice and law. The Censorate of the Ming and Qing eras, who were responsible for the monitoring of the civil service, wore the xiezhi as a badge of office. Among the common folk, the image of the xiezhi was believed to dispel evil spirits; a xiezhi might be carved on a lock to frighten off evil spirits. Similarly, military policemen of the Republic of China wear badges bearing the xiezhi and it is engraved on the gavels in the law courts of the People's Republic of China.

In 2022, a species of prehistoric giraffoid artiodactyl from early Miocene China, Discokeryx xiezhi, was named after the Xiezhi in reference to a single bony plate on top of its skull which bore a resemblance to the horn of the mythical creature.

In other places

Japan
The kaichi is described as similar to a lion with one horn on the top of its head.

Korea
The xiezhi is known as haetae in Korea. According to Korean records, the haetae has a muscular leonine body covered with sharp scales, a bell in its neck, and a horn on its forehead. It lives in the frontier areas of Manchuria.

In Joseon-dynasty Korea, the haetae was believed to protect against fire disasters. Sculptures of haetae were used in architecture (for example, at Gyeongbok Palace) to ward off fire. A cartoon haetae named  is the city mascot of Seoul.

In English, the haetae may be called "the unicorn-lion."

Gallery

See also
Bixi
Qilin
Pixiu
Unicorn

Notes

References

External links

  'Haechi' the Symbol of Seoul: Seoul City Official Tourism (English)

Chinese legendary creatures
Legendary mammals